Bono Benić (1708, Čatići near Kakanj - 27 March 1785, Kraljeva Sutjeska) was a Franciscan from Bosnia, provincial of the Franciscan Province of Bosna Srebrena and a historian.

Life and work
As a 10-year-old boy he entered into Franciscan monastery in Kraljeva Sutjeska, where he received elementary and high school education. In Cremona, Italy he graduated from college after studying theology and philosophy. His Protocollum conventus Suttiscae is considered to be most valuable and biggest yearbook of 18th century on the area of Bosnia and Herzegovina.

Works
Cum Auctor Epitome (1777)
Yearbook of Sutjeska Monastery (1979 published)

Sources
Benić, Bono at enciklopedija.hr 

1708 births
1785 deaths
People from Kakanj
18th-century Roman Catholic priests  in the Ottoman Empire
Franciscans of the Franciscan Province of Bosnia
18th-century historians from the Ottoman Empire